Ed Regis is the name of:

Ed Regis (author), writer of popular science and technology books
Ed Regis (Jurassic Park), a fictional character in Jurassic Park